Sveinbjörn Beinteinsson (4 July 1924 – 23 December 1993) was an Icelandic religious leader and singer of rímur who was instrumental in helping to gain Icelandic government's recognition of the pre-Christian Heathenry in the country.

Biography 
Sveinbjörn lived his entire life in West Iceland Borgarfjörður. From 1944 on, he was a sheep farmer while also pursuing literary interests on the side. He published a book of rímur in 1945, a textbook on the verse forms of rímur in 1953, two volumes of his own verse in 1957 and 1976, and edited several anthologies. He was married to Svanfríður Hagvaag with whom he had two sons, born in 1965 and 1966.

The Ásatrúarfélagið ("Fellowship of Æsir faith"), which he co-founded in 1972, and for which he acted as allsherjargoði, was officially recognised as a religious body in 1973.

Sveinbjörn is regarded with much respect and affection amongst Germanic neopagans. Not only was he a well known rímur singer, or kvæðamaður, in Iceland, he also gained an audience and followers in Europe and North America. He sometimes performed at rock concerts and is the opening act in the film Rokk í Reykjavík, directed by Friðrik Þór Friðriksson. Sveinbjörn can be heard singing on the bootleg album "Ragnarok (A New Beginning)" by Burzum, on the last track of the album entitled "Havamal".
In 1978, Sveinbjörn appeared on the television program In Search Of in an episode on “Lost Vikings” which examined the possibility of Viking pre-Columbian contact with North America.
Sveinbjörn can be heard performing Ásatrú marriage rites for Genesis P-Orridge and Paula P-Orridge on Psychic TV's LP Live in Reykjavik and on the double LP entitled Those who do not.

In 1982 Sveinbjörn released an album, Eddukvæði (Songs from The Poetic Edda), in which he recites in rímur style 75 stanzas from Hávamál, Völuspá and Sigrdrífumál. The album, on the Gramm label, included a booklet of the poems in Icelandic, with translations into English, Swedish, and German.

David Tibet released a CD of Sveinbjörn performing his own rímur and reciting the traditional Poetic Edda under the title Current 93 presents Sveinbjörn 'Edda''' in two editions through the World Serpent Distribution.

His biography Allsherjargoðinn was written by Berglind Gunnarsdóttir and published in 1992.

A memorial stone for Sveinbjörn was inaugurated in Reykjavík on 22 April 2010. It is located next to the site of the planned hof Ásatrúarfélagsins on the hill Öskjuhlíð.

His sister, Halldóra B. Björnsson, translated Beowulf into Icelandic as Bjólfskviða'', "The Lay of Bjólfur" in 1968; a version was published in 1983.

Publications

Writings 
 Gömlu lögin, 1945.
 Bragfræði og háttatal, 1953.
 Stuðlagaldur, 1954.
 Vandkvæði, 1957.
 Reiðljóð, 1957.
 Heiðin, 1984.
 Gátur I-III, 1985-91.
 Bragskógar, 1989.

As editor 

 Rímnavaka, 1959.
 Rímnasafn, 1966.
 Fúsakver, 1976.
 Rimnasafn Sigurðar Breiðfjörð 1-6, 1961-73.
 Borgfirðingaljóð: ljóð eftir 120 höfunda, 1991.

Discography 
 Snælda tengd Bragfræði og háttatali, 1981.
 Eddukvæði, 1982.
 93 Current 93 Present Sveinbjörn Beinteinsson: Edda, 1990.

References

External links

 Discogs
 Interview
 Háttatal In Icelandic, but probably the best modern introduction to the metrics of Rímur.
 
 In Search of... "Lost Vikings" (TV Series) episode 61 Season 3 #13
 

1924 births
1993 deaths
Sveinbjorn Beinteinsson
Adherents of Germanic neopaganism
Founders of modern pagan movements
Sveinbjorn Beinteinsson
Modern pagan poets
Sveinbjorn Beinteinsson
Performers of modern pagan music
Sveinbjorn Beinteinsson